Doychin Vasilev (born 12 June 1944 in Sofia) is a Bulgarian alpinist and cinematographer who has climbed five Himalayan 8,000 m peaks: Dhaulagiri (in 1995), Mount Everest (1997), Makalu (1998), and Shishapangma and Cho Oyu (1999).  President of Alpine Club Vihren, Sofia.  Participant in the Bulgarian Antarctic expedition Tangra 2004/05, noted by Discovery Channel as a timeline event in Antarctic exploration.

Documentaries by Doychin Vasilev: Chomolungma (1997), Makalu (1998), Manaslu (1999), and White Dreams (2001)

Notes

References
 Individual Tours
 Bulgarian Travel Directory
 100% Journal (Bulgarian News Agency site)
 Sega Newspaper (Website)

1944 births
Living people
Bulgarian mountain climbers
Bulgarian film directors
Explorers of Antarctica
Film people from Sofia